La Vortaro (The Dictionary) is an Esperanto dictionary, created by Bernard Vivier.

La Vortaro is partner of the FREELANG Dictionary project with more than 130 languages with a free software for utilization.

Dictionary modules
Like the FREELANG dictionary, various language modules make up the core of the La Vortaro dictionary. Language modules may be accessed through the off-line FREELANG/La Vortaro dictionary program. The off-line dictionary program is currently available only for Microsoft Windows.
Available in Esperanto

Afrikaans
Basque
Bosnian
Catalan
Croatian
Czech
Danish
Dutch
Dutch (Suriname)
English
Finnish
French
West Frisian
German
Hungarian
Irish
Icelandic
Italian
Latin
Luxembourgish
Norwegian
Polish
Portuguese (Brazilian)
Serbian
Slovak
Spanish
Swedish
Ukrainian

See also 

 Freelang

External links
 La Vortaro
 Freelang

Vortaro